The Great Space Adventure is a 1963 film from Albert Zugsmith starring George Nader and Fay Spain.

Nader was signed in January 1963. The film was shot in the Philippines.

Production

Produced by Famous Players Corporation

References

External links
The Great Space Adventure at BFI

1963 films
1960s science fiction films
American science fiction films
1960s English-language films
Films directed by Albert Zugsmith
1960s American films